The 1999–2000 Moldovan "A" Division season is the 9th since its establishment. A total of 14 teams are contesting the league.

League table

References
 Moldova. Second Level 1999/2000 - RSSSF

External links
 "A" Division - moldova.sports.md

Moldovan Liga 1 seasons
2
Moldova